Youssef Sjoerd Idilbi (May 7, 1976 – May 15, 2008) was a Dutch actor.

Acting career
Born to a Frisian mother and a Palestinian father, Idilbi was one of Hollands first actors from foreign descent. He came out as gay when he was 14 years old.

Idilbi studied theater in Groningen and Amsterdam. His television debut came in 1999, with the role of Abdullah Yildirem in the series Westenwind. He also played in Russen (2001–2002) and Onderweg naar morgen (2002–2003), and in the West Frisian language series Dankert en Dankert.

Personal life

Death
Idilbi committed suicide on May 15, 2008, by jumping off the roof of the Theater School in Amsterdam.

References

External links

1976 births
2008 deaths
People from Drachten
Dutch male stage actors
Dutch male television actors
Dutch people of Palestinian descent
Dutch male soap opera actors
Palestinian male actors
Palestinian television actors
Dutch gay actors
Suicides by jumping in the Netherlands
2008 suicides
20th-century Dutch LGBT people